Corné du Plessis (born 20 March 1978) is a South African sprinter. Together with Morne Nagel, Lee-Roy Newton and Mathew Quinn he won a silver medal in 4 x 100 metres relay at the 2001 World Championships in Athletics. Their time of 38.47 seconds was a South African record. Earlier in the season he won the bronze medal in the 200 metres at the 2001 Summer Universiade.

Following the ruling of 13 December 2005 which retroactively disqualified Tim Montgomery and henceforth the American team, the South African team were promoted to gold medallists. Du Plessis won another relay gold medal with South Africa at the 2008 African Championships in Athletics.

Competition record

Personal bests
100 metres - 10.25 (2001)
200 metres - 20.39 (2001)

References

External links

South African male sprinters
1978 births
Living people
Afrikaner people
South African people of Dutch descent
World Athletics Championships medalists
World Athletics Championships athletes for South Africa
Universiade medalists in athletics (track and field)
Universiade bronze medalists for South Africa
World Athletics Championships winners
Medalists at the 2001 Summer Universiade